Zyuzino is a Moscow Metro station of the Bolshaya Koltsevaya line. It was opened on 7 December 2021 as part of the section between Mnyovniki and Kakhovskaya.

Gallery

References

Moscow Metro stations
Bolshaya Koltsevaya line
Railway stations located underground in Russia
Railway stations under construction in Russia
Railway stations in Russia opened in 2021